The Christmas Album, released in 2020, was the second Christmas album by American actor and singer Leslie Odom Jr.. It featured interpretations of classic holiday songs, as well as original songs.

Background 
The Christmas Album is the final album of a four-album deal with S-Curve Records made in 2016, and Odom's second Christmas music album, after Simply Christmas.

Track listing

References 

2020 Christmas albums
Christmas albums by American artists
Leslie Odom Jr. albums
Jazz Christmas albums
S-Curve Records albums